William Dale Archerd (May 5, 1912 – October 29, 1977) was an American serial killer who killed at least three people with insulin injections between 1956 and 1966 in Northern California. He was the first to be convicted of use of insulin as a murder weapon in the US, and is suspected in three more cases.

Life 
Archerd was always interested in medicine, but had neither the discipline nor the money to correspond for such a study. In 1940 and 1941, he worked as an assistant at the Camarillo State Mental Hospital in wards where patients were treated with insulin shock therapies.

In 1950 he was convicted to five years of probation for possession of morphine in San Francisco. In another conviction, this parole was revoked. After escaping from a minimum security prison in Chino, he was arrested again, put in San Quentin Prison and released again in 1953 on probation.

Arrest and conviction 
Archerd was arrested on July 27, 1967, in Los Angeles for a threefold murder. He was convicted of killing the following:
Zella Archerd, his fourth wife (July 25, 1956, two months after their wedding),
Burney Archerd, his nephew (September 2, 1961, in Long Beach), and Mary Brinker Arden, his seventh wife (November 3, 1966).

Others suspected to be victims of Archerd are:
William Jones Jr. (October 12, 1947, in Fontana),
Juanita Plum Archerd, his fifth wife (March 13, 1958, in Las Vegas), and Frank Stewart (March 17, 1960).

All exhibited symptoms of hypoglycemia.

Archerd was sentenced to death on March 6, 1968, for three of the murder cases. The medical personnel, law enforcement, and  prosecution team were unaware of the availability of an accurate and sensitive assay for blood insulin levels developed years earlier by Rosalyn Yalow in collaboration with Solomon Berson working at the Bronx Veterans Administration Hospital. Instead they presented some unproven laboratory evidence that, in retrospect, should not have been accepted in court.  

In December 1970, the death sentence was upheld by the California Supreme Court. In 1972, the sentence was instead changed to life imprisonment after a ruling by the United States Supreme Court. Archerd died of pneumonia in 1977 at the age of 65.

See also 
 List of serial killers in the United States

References 

 Newton, Michael: An Encyclopedia of Modern Serial Killers - Hunting Humans. 5th edition, Stocker, Graz 2009,  (Source, unless specified directly)

1912 births
1947 murders in the United States
1966 murders in the United States
1977 deaths
American people who died in prison custody
American prisoners sentenced to death
American serial killers
Deaths from pneumonia in California
Male serial killers
People from California
People from Dardanelle, Arkansas
Poisoners
Prisoners sentenced to death by California
Prisoners who died in California detention
Serial killers who died in prison custody
Uxoricides